Crazy, Lovely, Cool is a Nigerian Television series directed by Obi Emelonye and in production partnership with The Nollywood Factory (TNF) and Trace TV.

Premise 
Crazy, Lovely, Cool is a coming-of-age TV series that takes a fond look at the lives, joys and struggles of a group of charismatic students whose paths cross on the campus of Nigeria's largest university via the shocking revelations of an eponymous gossip blog.

The production of the series was a partnership and production of Obi Emelonye, The Nollywood Factory and Trace TV according to News Agency of Nigeria (NAN). Principal photography happened in 2017 at the University of Nigeria, Nsukka. It also features the music of ID Cabasa and a few cast members 'Kheengz' (King Bawa) and Ceeza Milli.

Cast 

 Adesua Etomi-Wellington as Funmi
 Enyinna Nwigwe as Izu
 Uru Eke as Dr. Douglas
 Zynnell Zuh as Nana
 Lorenzo Menakaya as Ubong
 Anthony Monjaro as Doctor
 Obi Okoli as Professor
Emmanuel Emenu as Luciano
 Swanky JKA as Neo
 Kheengz (King Bawa), as Hassan

References

External links 
 Crazy Lovely, Cool. IMDB

Nigerian drama television series